Valerie Pachner (born 26 June 1987) is an Austrian actress.

Life and work 
Valerie Pachner grew up in Bad Schallerbach, Austria, and studied acting at the Max Reinhardt Seminar in Vienna from 2009 to 2013. She was then part of the ensemble cast at the Residenztheater in Munich, under artistic director Martin Kušej until 2017. Her work on stage was awarded twice in 2016.

Pachner starred as the female lead in the 2015 film Bad Luck (directed by Thomas Woschitz), which was nominated for the Max-Ophüls-Preis. After that she appeared in Elisabeth Scharang's Jack and Maria Schrader's biopic of the Austrian writer Stefan Zweig, Vor der Morgenröte (Stefan Zweig: Farewell to Europe), playing Zweig's stepdaughter alongside Barbara Sukowa and Josef Hader as Zweig.

For her portrayal of Egon Schiele's muse Wally Neuzil in Dieter Berner's Egon Schiele: Death and the Maiden she was awarded the Austrian Film Award and the Romy.

In 2019 The Ground Beneath My Feet by Marie Kreutzer was selected to compete for the Golden Bear at the 69th Berlin International Film Festival. Pachner's leading performance was critically acclaimed internationally and earned her three awards, including the German Acting Award for Best Actress. The film had a limited theatrical release in the U.S. and was named one of The 10 Best Movies of 2019 by Vanity Fair.

The same year, Terrence Malick's A Hidden Life with Pachner playing the female lead, Franziska Jägerstätter, premiered in competition at the 72nd Cannes Film Festival. It was also shown at the Toronto International Film Festival, the Telluride Film Festival and the Deauville American Film Festival. IndieWire called her performance as one of the best by an actress in 2019.

Filmography

Film

Television

Theatre

Awards 

 2004: Best Performance by a Young Actress (YOUKI)
 2016: Förderpreis der Freunde des Residenztheaters
 2016: Bayerischer Kunstförderpreis for Performing Arts
 2017: Austrian Film Award (Best Actress)
 2017: Romy (most popular shooting star, female)
 2019: Best Performance by a young actress at the Filmkunstfest Mecklenburg-Vorpommern
 2019: Premio Maguey: Best Performance at the Guadalajara International Film Festival 2019: German Acting Award for Best Actress Deutscher Schauspielpreis 2019: Discovery Award at the SCAD Filmfestival Savannah College of Art and Design References 

 Süddeutsche Zeitung: In Sehnsucht verbunden, Interview about Three Sisters at the Residenztheater in Munich. Retrieved 24 March 2015.
 Münchner Merkur: Erstmal angekommen, Portrait about Valerie Pachner. Retrieved 22 March 2015.
 Terrence Malick Announces Next Film 'Radegund', Based on the Life of Franz Jägerstätter The Film Stage. Retrieved 22 June 2016.
 Berlinale: Mister Smith Entertainment Takes International Sales on Terrence Malick’s ‘Radegund’ Variety. Retrieved  23 January 2017.
 Valerie Pachners' debut role in A Hidden Life wins Discovery Award SCADDistrict. Retrieved  05 January 2020.
 Best Actress Performances 2019 indiewire. Retrieved  05 January 2020.
 Best Movies 2019'' Vanity Fair. Retrieved  05 January 2020.

External links 
 
 Valerie Pachner (agency)
 Residenztheater

Living people
1987 births
People from Grieskirchen District
21st-century Austrian actresses
Austrian film actresses
Austrian television actresses
Austrian stage actresses